Tasmannia lanceolata (syn. Drimys lanceolata), commonly known as Tasmanian pepperberry or mountain pepper, is a shrub native to woodlands and cool temperate rainforest of south-eastern Australia. The shrub varies from 2 to 10 m high. The aromatic leaves are lanceolate to narrow-elliptic or oblanceolate, 4–12 cm long, and 0.7–2.0 cm wide, with a distinctly pale undersurface. Stems are quite red in colour. The small cream or white flowers appear in summer and are followed by black, globose, two-lobed berries 5–8 mm wide, which appear in autumn. There are separate male and female plants.

Originally described by French botanist Jean Louis Marie Poiret, it gained its current name in 1969 by A.C. Smith. It had been known for many years as Drimys lanceolata.

It is found in Tasmania and northwards through Victoria to Barrington Tops in New South Wales. It is found in gullies in rainforests.

Uses
Polygodial has been identified as the primary active compound in Tasmannia lanceolata, and is also responsible for its peppery taste.  The fruits also contain benzoic acids, flavanols, and flavanones, as well as eugenol, methyl eugenol, and gallic acid, and also the glycosides quercetin and rutin.

The leaf and berry are used as a spice, typically dried. Tasmanian pepperberry was used as a colonial pepper substitute. More recently, it has become popularised as a bushfood condiment. It can be added to curries, cheeses, and alcoholic beverages. It is exported to Japan to flavour wasabi. The berries are sweet and fruity at first with a lingering peppery aftertaste. Dried T. lanceolata berries and leaves have strong antimicrobial activity against food spoilage organisms. It also has high antioxidant activity. Low safrole clonal selections are grown in plantations for commercial use, as safrole is considered a low-risk toxin.

Used in colonial medicine as a substitute for Winter's bark, a stomachic, it was also used for treating scurvy. Tasmanian pepper is one of a number of native Australian herbs and food species being supported by the Australian Native Food Industry Ltd, which brings together producers of food species from all parts of Australia. The pepperberry can be used as a fish poison.

The 1889 book The Useful Native Plants of Australia records that common names included "Pepper Tree" and that "the drupe is used as a condiment, being a fair substitute for pepper, or rather allspice [...] The leaves and bark also have a hot, biting, cinnamon-like taste."

It can be grown as a garden plant. Its berries attract birds, including currawongs, that feed on them. It can be propagated from cuttings or seed, and can grow in a well-drained acidic soil with some shade, but is sensitive to Phytophthora cinnamomi.

Garden cultivars include 'Mt. Wellington', a compact plant with coppery new growth, and 'Suzette', a variegated cultivar.

See also
List of Australian herbs and spices

References

External links

Bruneteau, Jean-Paul, Tukka, Real Australian Food, 

Flora of New South Wales
Flora of Tasmania
Flora of Victoria (Australia)
Spices
lanceolata